It's a Wonderful Life (simplified Chinese: 好运到) is a Singaporean Chinese New Year 2013 drama. It was telecast on Singapore's free-to-air channel, MediaCorp Channel 8. It stars Ha Yu, Lin Meijiao, Chen Liping, Huang Wenyong, Elvin Ng, Julie Tan and Paige Chua as the cast of the series. It made its debut on 21 January 2013 and consists of 20 episodes and was screened on every weekday night at 9:00 pm. It was also Huang Wenyong's final drama.

Overview
The plot revolves around Li and Hao families and several couples and deals with family and getting along with in-laws.

Episodes

Cast

Production
Filming started on 23 Jul 2012 and is expected to end on 31 Oct 2012 possibly due to Beyond'''s early filming. Out-of-studio filming locations included Ang Mo Kio, Tiong Bahru, Commonwealth, Haw Par Villa, East Coast and Marina.

Trailers first screened on 9 Jan 2013.

The drama used a new credits roll, which will change in the next few dramas. Bloopers (without audio) are shown during the ending credits of each episode.

Initially, a sequel of Love Thy Neighbour was to be filmed and aired as the Chinese special but was scrapped as Chin would not be available due to her studies. This series, however, still featured a number of artistes who appeared on Love Thy Neighbour, including Ha Yu, Brandon Wong, Huang Wenyong, and Lin Meijiao, among others.

Release
BroadcastIt's a Wonderful Life aired in conjunction with Chinese New Year 2013. It was the first drama to be broadcast exclusively in Malaysia after its first telecast of two weeks, it debuted on Astro Shuang Xing on 6 February and ended its run on 5 March 2013.

 Talkshow 
A talkshow, It's More Than A Wonderful Life, talking about Singapore's everyday lives was released. It is hosted by Guo Liang and Quan Yi Fong with appearances from the cast of the drama (Chen Liping, Paige Chua, Zen Chong, Dennis Chew and Brandon Wong).

 Reception 
The series is one of three drama serials to tie-in for 3rd-highest-rated drama serial in 2013 (the other two are Break Free and The Journey: A Voyage), with an average viewership of 835,000, breaking the record set by Beyond'' (with 834,000). Despite this, it has only two nominations for Star Awards 20.

See also 
List of programmes broadcast by Mediacorp Channel 8
Aloysius Pang
Huang Wen Yong

References

External links
It's a Wonderful Life on MediaCorp website

Singapore Chinese dramas
2013 Singaporean television series debuts
Channel 8 (Singapore) original programming